"Por Nada" is a song by Dominican singer Henry Santos. It was released in 2011 and served as the second single for his debut album Introducing Henry Santos (2011). The music video was released on February 29, 2012. He also created a musical film to promote the song.

Charts

References

2011 songs
2011 singles
Henry Santos songs
Universal Music Latin Entertainment singles